Luca Baldini (born 10 October 1976 in Messina, Italy) is a long distance swimmer from Italy.

Biography

References
Federazione Italiana nuoto

External links

1976 births
Living people
Italian male long-distance swimmers
Italian male swimmers
Sportspeople from Messina
World Aquatics Championships medalists in open water swimming
Universiade medalists in swimming
Universiade silver medalists for Italy
Medalists at the 2001 Summer Universiade
20th-century Italian people
21st-century Italian people